Amani Al-Khatahtbeh is an American author, activist and tech entrepreneur. She is the founder of MuslimGirl.com, a blog for Muslim women. In 2016, she was included in Forbes 30 Under 30 in Media for her work with MuslimGirl. She was named one of the 25 most influential Muslim Americans by CNN. She unsuccessfully ran in the Democratic primary for U.S. Representative for New Jersey's 6th Congressional district in 2020.

Early years 
Al-Khatahtbeh was raised in New Jersey to Arab parents of Jordanian and Palestinian descent. When she was 13 years old, her family decided to move to Jordan due to concerns of increased violence against the Muslim community in the United States. After her mother fell ill, her family moved back to New Jersey to be closer to their relatives who still lived there. Back in New Jersey, she continued to feel closer to her Muslim identity and decided to wear the hijab as an act of resistance against Islamophobia. Due to the fact that there was no online community of young Muslim women, she decided to make her own and founded MuslimGirl.com in 2009 as a 17-year-old high school senior. With friends from her mosque, al-Khatahtbeh published blogs on the site.

Following high school, she attended Rutgers University, graduating in 2014 with a political science degree. She then worked for a non-profit organization based in Washington, D.C. before moving to New York and briefly working for a major media organization.

Career

MuslimGirl
In the beginning of 2015, MuslimGirl developed a volunteer staff and saw a large increase its readership. The site logged 1.7 million hits in 2018.

In 2016, she partnered with Teen Vogue for a web series that explored issues of concern to young Muslim women.

On March 27, 2017, MuslimGirl.com created Muslim Women's Day to increase representation of Muslim Women in media outlets.

Literary career
Al-Khatahtbeh's book, MuslimGirl: A Coming of Age, was released in October 2016. She was a panelist at the 2017 Brisbane Writers Festival in Brisbane, Queensland, Australia.

Politics
On April 4, 2020, Al-Khatahtbeh announced her candidacy in the race to represent New Jersey's 6th congressional district, becoming the first Muslim woman in New Jersey to run for federal office. In the Democratic primary election, her opponents were the 16-term incumbent, Frank Pallone, and attorney Russ Cirincione.

Al-Khatahtbeh's campaign platform focused on progressive issues including Medicare for All, the Green New Deal, student debt cancellation, free public university tuition, criminal justice reform, and the federal minimum wage of $15.

Controversies
John-Paul Pagano, writing in Tablet Magazine, accused MuslimGirl.com of allowing anti-Semitic views to be posted, including, in particular, the hosting of an article that promotes conspiracy theories claiming Israeli government-sponsored organ harvesting.

In November 2020, she was briefly arrested and escorted out of an aircraft at Newark Liberty International Airport following a dispute with another passenger. She attributed the arrest to having been wrongfully singled out in the aftermath of the dispute.

References

External links
Official 2020 campaign website

Instagram profile

Living people
American Muslims
American people of Jordanian descent
American people of Palestinian descent
Rutgers University alumni
Writers from New Jersey
1992 births
New Jersey Democrats